The 2002–03 Calgary Flames season was the 23rd National Hockey League season in Calgary. A relatively successful start to the season quickly gave way to disaster as the Flames lost 11 of 12 games in a November stretch dropping the Flames out of contention, ultimately failing to qualify for the playoffs for the seventh consecutive season.

The season began as the last had ended: with forward Marc Savard and head coach Greg Gilbert in bitter, public feud. After arguing in the media for nearly a year, the Flames finally granted the disgruntled players request, trading Savard to the Atlanta Thrashers. Gilbert himself would not last much longer with the Flames, as he would be fired by the club barely two weeks after Savard was dealt.

The Flames would quickly find a replacement for Gilbert, announcing they had hired Darryl Sutter shortly before the new year. Sutter immediately began shaping the Flames to his own style, and the Flames finished 19–16–8–1 under their new bench boss.

Following the season, the Flames announced that they would not renew General Manager Craig Button's contract. Sutter took over as GM, carrying the dual roles until the end of the 2005–06 season.

Flames mascot, Harvey the Hound, gained widespread publicity in January 2003 following an incident with Edmonton Oilers head coach, Craig MacTavish. With the Flames leading 4–0, Harvey was taunting the Oilers behind their bench. The frustrated coach reached up and ripped Harvey's signature red tongue out of his mouth, tossing it into the crowd. The incident would seem to spark the Oilers, who scored three goals shortly after. The Flames would hold on to win 4–3, however. The incident made headlines throughout North America, and led to many jokes, including having many other NHL team mascots arrive at the 2003 All-Star Game with their tongues hanging out.

Regular season
The Flames struggled offensively and were shut out a league-high 10 times, tied with the Minnesota Wild, Nashville Predators and Pittsburgh Penguins.

Calgary finished 12th in the Western Conference, 17 points behind the 8th place Edmonton Oilers.

Final standings

Schedule and results

|- align="center" bgcolor="#ffbbbb" 
| 1 || October 10 || Vancouver || 3 – 0 || Calgary || || Turek || 17,409 || 0–1–0–0 || 0 || 
|- align="center" bgcolor="#ffbbbb" 
| 2 || October 12 || Philadelphia || 5 – 4 || Calgary || || Turek || 16,750 || 0–2–0–0 || 0 || 
|- align="center" bgcolor="#bbffbb" 
| 3 || October 14 || Calgary || 3 – 2 || Vancouver || || Turek || 18,016 || 1–2–0–0 || 2 || 
|- align="center" bgcolor="#ffffbb" 
| 4 || October 17 || Boston || 3 – 3 || Calgary || OT || Turek || 15,346 || 1–2–1–0 || 3 || 
|- align="center" bgcolor="#bbffbb" 
| 5 || October 19 || Calgary || 5 – 2 || Chicago || || Turek || 14,034 || 2–2–1–0 || 5 || 
|- align="center" bgcolor="#ffbbbb" 
| 6 || October 21 || Calgary || 0 – 4 || Detroit || || McLennan || 20,058 || 2–3–1–0 || 5 || 
|- align="center" bgcolor="#ffdddd" 
| 7 || October 22 || Calgary || 3 – 4 || Minnesota || OT || Turek || 18,064 || 2–3–1–1 || 6 || 
|- align="center" bgcolor="#ffffbb" 
| 8 || October 24 || Dallas || 3 – 3 || Calgary || OT || Turek || 14,625 || 2–3–2–1 || 7 || 
|- align="center" bgcolor="#ffdddd" 
| 9 || October 26 || St. Louis || 4 – 3 || Calgary || OT || Turek || 14,538 || 2–3–2–2 || 8 || 
|- align="center" bgcolor="#bbffbb" 
| 10 || October 31 || Buffalo || 0 – 3 || Calgary || || Turek || 14,822 || 3–3–2–2 || 10 || 
|-

|- align="center" bgcolor="#ffffbb" 
| 11 || November 2 || Colorado || 4 – 4 || Calgary || OT || McLennan || 17,448 || 3–3–3–2 || 11 || 
|- align="center" bgcolor="#bbffbb" 
| 12 || November 4 || Calgary || 4 – 2 || NY Islanders || || McLennan || 12,316 || 4–3–3–2 || 13 || 
|- align="center" bgcolor="#bbffbb" 
| 13 || November 5 || Calgary || 3 – 2 || New Jersey || || McLennan || 12,315 || 5–3–3–2 || 15 || 
|- align="center" bgcolor="#ffdddd" 
| 14 || November 7 || Calgary || 0 – 1 || NY Rangers || OT || McLennan || 18,200 || 5–3–3–3 || 16 || 
|- align="center" bgcolor="#ffbbbb" 
| 15 || November 9 || Calgary || 0 – 3 || Florida || || McLennan || 14,794 || 5–4–3–3 || 16 || 
|- align="center" bgcolor="#ffbbbb" 
| 16 || November 11 || Calgary || 1 – 2 || Atlanta || || McLennan || 10,501 || 5–5–3–3 || 16 || 
|- align="center" bgcolor="#ffbbbb" 
| 17 || November 14 || NY Rangers || 2 – 1 || Calgary || || McLennan || 16,386 || 5–6–3–3 || 16 || 
|- align="center" bgcolor="#ffbbbb" 
| 18 || November 16 || St. Louis || 1 – 0 || Calgary || || McLennan || 15,505 || 5–7–3–3 || 16 || 
|- align="center" bgcolor="#ffbbbb" 
| 19 || November 19 || Detroit || 5 – 0 || Calgary || || McLennan || 10,061 || 5–8–3–3 || 16 || 
|- align="center" bgcolor="#ffbbbb" 
| 20 || November 21 || Edmonton || 3 – 1 || Calgary || || McLennan || 17,660 || 5–9–3–3 || 16 || 
|- align="center" bgcolor="#bbffbb" 
| 21 || November 23 || Chicago || 1 – 3 || Calgary || || Turek || 15,826 || 6–9–3–3 || 18 || 
|- align="center" bgcolor="#ffbbbb"
| 22 || November 26 || Calgary || 2 – 7 || Boston || || Turek || 13,582 || 6–10–3–3 || 18 || 
|- align="center" bgcolor="#ffbbbb"
| 23 || November 27 || Calgary || 2 – 4 || Washington || || Turek || 13,532 || 6–11–3–3 || 18 || 
|- align="center" bgcolor="#ffbbbb"
| 24 || November 29 || Calgary || 2 – 7 || St. Louis || || Turek || 19,326 || 6–12–3–3 || 18 || 
|-

|- align="center" bgcolor="#ffbbbb"
| 25 || December 1 || Calgary || 2 – 4 || Detroit || || Turek || 20,058 || 6–13–3–3 || 18 || 
|- align="center" bgcolor="#bbffbb" 
| 26 || December 3 || Calgary || 2 – 1 || Colorado || || Turek || 18,007 || 7–13–3–3 || 20 || 
|- align="center" bgcolor="#ffffbb" 
| 27 || December 5 || Minnesota || 1 – 1 || Calgary || OT || Turek || 14,118 || 7–13–4–3 || 21 || 
|- align="center" bgcolor="#bbffbb" 
| 28 || December 9 || Calgary || 2 – 1 || Vancouver || || Turek || 18,422 || 8–13–4–3 || 23 || 
|- align="center" bgcolor="#ffbbbb"
| 29 || December 12 || Carolina || 4 – 3 || Calgary || || Turek || 14,528 || 8–14–4–3 || 23 || 
|- align="center" bgcolor="#ffbbbb"
| 30 || December 14 || Colorado || 3 – 1 || Calgary || || Turek || 17,192 || 8–15–4–3 || 23 || 
|- align="center" bgcolor="#ffffbb" 
| 31 || December 15 || Calgary || 3 – 3 || Vancouver || OT || Turek || 18,422 || 8–15–5–3 || 24 || 
|- align="center" bgcolor="#bbffbb" 
| 32 || December 17 || Calgary || 3 – 0 || Nashville || || Turek || 10,216 || 9–15–5–3 || 26 || 
|- align="center" bgcolor="#ffbbbb" 
| 33 || December 19 || Calgary || 0 – 3 || Columbus || || Turek || 17,230 || 9–16–5–3 || 26 || 
|- align="center" bgcolor="#ffbbbb"
| 34 || December 21 || Calgary || 0 – 2 || Pittsburgh || || Turek || 12,571 || 9–17–5–3 || 26 || 
|- align="center" bgcolor="#bbffbb" 
| 35 || December 23 || Calgary || 3 – 2 || Minnesota || || Turek || 18,568 || 10–17–5–3 || 28 || 
|- align="center" bgcolor="#ffbbbb"
| 36 || December 27 || Toronto || 4 – 3 || Calgary || || Turek || 18,014 || 10–18–5–3 || 28 || 
|- align="center" bgcolor="#bbffbb" 
| 37 || December 29 || Anaheim || 2 – 4 || Calgary || || Turek || 16,922 || 11–18–5–3 || 30 || 
|- align="center" bgcolor="#ffffbb" 
| 38 || December 31 || Montreal || 1 – 1 || Calgary || OT || Turek || 18,159 || 11–18–6–3 || 31 || 
|-

|- align="center" bgcolor="#bbffbb" 
| 39 || January 2 || Tampa Bay || 1 – 4 || Calgary || || Turek || 14,881 || 12–18–6–3 || 33 || 
|- align="center" bgcolor="#bbffbb"
| 40 || January 4 || Minnesota || 2 – 3 || Calgary || || Turek || 15,974 || 13–18–6–3 || 35 || 
|- align="center" bgcolor="#bbffbb" 
| 41 || January 7 || Calgary || 4 – 2 || Colorado || || Turek || 18,007 || 14–18–6–3 || 37 || 
|- align="center" bgcolor="#ffbbbb" 
| 42 || January 9 || Ottawa || 1 – 0 || Calgary || || Turek || 16,058 || 14–19–6–3 || 37 || 
|- align="center" bgcolor="#ffbbbb" 
| 43 || January 11 || Columbus || 7 – 2 || Calgary || || Turek || 14,827 || 14–20–6–3 || 37 || 
|- align="center" bgcolor="#ffbbbb" 
| 44 || January 13 || Calgary || 2 – 4 || Montreal || || Turek || 20,630 || 14–21–6–3 || 37 || 
|- align="center" bgcolor="#ffbbbb" 
| 45 || January 14 || Calgary || 2 – 3 || Toronto || || Turek || 19,290 || 14–22–6–3 || 37 || 
|- align="center" bgcolor="#ffffbb" 
| 46 || January 16 || Nashville || 2 – 2 || Calgary || OT || McLennan || 14,621 || 14–22–7–3 || 38 || 
|- align="center" bgcolor="#bbffbb" 
| 47 || January 18 || Los Angeles || 1 – 2 || Calgary || OT || Turek || 16,675 || 15–22–7–3 || 40 || 
|- align="center" bgcolor="#bbffbb" 
| 48 || January 20 || Edmonton || 3 – 4 || Calgary || || Turek || 17,832 || 16–22–7–3 || 42 || 
|- align="center" bgcolor="#ffbbbb" 
| 49 || January 23 || Phoenix || 7 – 1 || Calgary || || Turek || 14,865 || 16–23–7–3 || 42 || 
|- align="center" bgcolor="#bbffbb" 
| 50 || January 25 || Detroit || 1 – 4 || Calgary || || Turek || 18,028 || 17–23–7–3 || 44 || 
|- align="center" bgcolor="#ffbbbb" 
| 51 || January 28 || Calgary || 3 – 4 || Phoenix || || Turek || 14,619 || 17–24–7–3 || 44 || 
|- align="center" bgcolor="#ffbbbb" 
| 52 || January 29 || Calgary || 1 – 4 || Dallas || || Turek || 18,532 || 17–25–7–3 || 44 || 
|-

|- align="center" bgcolor="#ffbbbb" 
| 53 || February 4 || Anaheim || 3 – 2 || Calgary || || Turek || 14,110 || 17–26–7–3 || 44 || 
|- align="center" bgcolor="#ffffbb" 
| 54 || February 6 || Chicago || 2 – 2 || Calgary || OT || McLennan || 16,027 || 17–26–8–3 || 45 || 
|- align="center" bgcolor="#bbffbb" 
| 55 || February 7 || Calgary || 4 – 3 || Edmonton || || Turek || 16,839 || 18–26–8–3 || 47 || 
|- align="center" bgcolor="#ffbbbb" 
| 56 || February 9 || Calgary || 2 – 4 || Colorado || || Turek || 18,007 || 18–27–8–3 || 47 || 
|- align="center" bgcolor="#ffdddd" 
| 57 || February 12 || Calgary || 3 – 4 || Anaheim || OT || McLennan || 11,612 || 18–27–8–4 || 48 || 
|- align="center" bgcolor="#ffbbbb" 
| 58 || February 13 || Calgary || 2 – 4 || Los Angeles || || Turek || 17,539 || 18–28–8–4 || 48 || 
|- align="center" bgcolor="#ffffbb" 
| 59 || February 15 || Vancouver || 2 – 2 || Calgary || OT || Turek || 18,252 || 18–28–9–4 || 49 || 
|- align="center" bgcolor="#ffbbbb" 
| 60 || February 17 || Calgary || 3 – 5 || St. Louis || || Turek || 19,522 || 18–29–9–4 || 49 || 
|- align="center" bgcolor="#ffffbb" 
| 61 || February 19 || Calgary || 1 – 1 || Dallas || OT || Turek || 18,532 || 18–29–10–4 || 50 || 
|- align="center" bgcolor="#ffbbbb" 
| 62 || February 20 || Calgary || 1 – 4 || Nashville || || McLennan || 10,842 || 18–30–10–4 || 50 || 
|- align="center" bgcolor="#bbffbb" 
| 63 || February 23 || Calgary || 4 – 2 || Phoenix || || Turek || 14,241 || 19–30–10–4 || 52 || 
|- align="center" bgcolor="#ffbbbb" 
| 64 || February 24 || Calgary || 2 – 5 || San Jose || || Turek || 17,311 || 19–31–10–4 || 52 || 
|-

|- align="center" bgcolor="#bbffbb" 
| 65 || March 1 || San Jose || 3 – 4 || Calgary || || Turek || 17,575 || 20–31–10–4 || 54 || 
|- align="center" bgcolor="#bbffbb" 
| 66 || March 5 || New Jersey || 4 – 5 || Calgary || OT || Turek || 16,106 || 21–31–10–4 || 56 || 
|- align="center" bgcolor="#bbffbb" 
| 67 || March 7 || Calgary || 2 – 0 || Chicago || || Turek || 14,702 || 22–31–10–4 || 58 || 
|- align="center" bgcolor="#bbffbb" 
| 68 || March 8 || Calgary || 3 – 2 || Columbus || OT || Turek || 18,136 || 23–31–10–4 || 60 || 
|- align="center" bgcolor="#ffbbbb" 
| 69 || March 11 || Edmonton || 5 – 2 || Calgary || || Turek || 17,714 || 23–32–10–4 || 60 || 
|- align="center" bgcolor="#bbffbb" 
| 70 || March 13 || Toronto || 3 – 4 || Calgary || OT || Turek || 18,064 || 24–32–10–4 || 62 || 
|- align="center" bgcolor="#ffbbbb" 
| 71 || March 15 || Calgary || 2 – 3 || San Jose || || Turek || 17,496 || 24–33–10–4 || 62 || 
|- align="center" bgcolor="#ffffbb" 
| 72 || March 16 || Calgary || 2 – 2 || Anaheim || OT || McLennan || 16,726 || 24–33–11–4 || 63 || 
|- align="center" bgcolor="#bbffbb" 
| 73 || March 18 || Calgary || 4 – 1 || Los Angeles || || Turek || 17,470 || 25–33–11–4 || 65 || 
|- align="center" bgcolor="#ffbbbb" 
| 74 || March 20 || Washington || 4 – 1 || Calgary || || Turek || 15,827 || 25–34–11–4 || 65 || 
|- align="center" bgcolor="#ffffbb" 
| 75 || March 22 || Nashville || 1 – 1 || Calgary || OT || Turek || 16,628 || 25–34–12–4 || 66 || 
|- align="center" bgcolor="#bbffbb" 
| 76 || March 24 || Phoenix || 0 – 2 || Calgary || || Turek || 16,685 || 26–34–12–4 || 68 || 
|- align="center" bgcolor="#bbffbb" 
| 77 || March 27 || Dallas || 1 – 2 || Calgary || OT || Turek || 16,533 || 27–34–12–4 || 70 || 
|- align="center" bgcolor="#ffbbbb" 
| 78 || March 29 || Columbus || 6 – 4 || Calgary || || Turek || 16,007 || 27–35–12–4 || 70 || 
|- align="center" bgcolor="#ffbbbb" 
| 79 || March 31 || Calgary || 0 – 3 || Minnesota || || McLennan || 18,568 || 27–36–12–4 || 70 || 
|-

|- align="center" bgcolor="#ffffbb" 
| 80 || April 2 || San Jose || 2 – 2 || Calgary || OT || Turek || 14,207 || 27–36–13–4 || 71 || 
|- align="center" bgcolor="#bbffbb"
| 81 || April 4 || Los Angeles || 1 – 2 || Calgary || OT || Turek || 17,003 || 28–36–13–4 || 73 || 
|- align="center" bgcolor="#bbffbb" 
| 82 || April 5 || Calgary || 4 – 1 || Edmonton || || Turek || 16,839 || 29–36–13–4 || 75 || 
|-

|-
| Legend:

Player statistics

Scoring
 Position abbreviations: C = Centre; D = Defence; G = Goaltender; LW = Left Wing; RW = Right Wing
  = Joined team via a transaction (e.g., trade, waivers, signing) during the season. Stats reflect time with the Flames only.
  = Left team via a transaction (e.g., trade, waivers, release) during the season. Stats reflect time with the Flames only.

Goaltending

Awards and records

Awards

Milestones

Transactions
The Flames were involved in the following transactions from June 14, 2002, the day after the deciding game of the 2002 Stanley Cup Finals, through June 9, 2003, the day of the deciding game of the 2003 Stanley Cup Finals.

Trades

Players acquired

Players lost

Signings

Draft picks

Calgary's picks at the 2002 NHL Entry Draft in Toronto, Ontario. The Flames had the 9th overall pick, however opted to drop down one spot to 10th via a trade with the Florida Panthers.

Farm teams

Saint John Flames
The 2002–03 season would be the tenth, and last, season in New Brunswick, as the Flames bought out the local ownership's share of the team following the season and suspended operations. The "Baby Flames" finished 32–41–6–1, last in the Canadian Division, and out of the playoffs. Robert Dome led the team with 27 goals and 56 points. Dany Sabourin and Levente Szuper split goaltending duties for the Flames.

Johnstown Chiefs
The Chiefs finished the 2002–03 season with a record of 28–33–11, finishing fifth in the Northwest Division, failing to qualify for the playoffs.

Following the season, the Flames announced they were switching affiliations to a new expansion team, the Las Vegas Wranglers.

See also
2002–03 NHL season

Notes

References

Player stats: 2006–07 Calgary Flames Media Guide - 2002–03 stats, pg. 109.

Calgary Flames seasons
Calgary Flames season, 2002-03
Cal